Solomon Newton Pettis (October 10, 1827 – September 18, 1900) was a Republican member of the U.S. House of Representatives from Pennsylvania.

Early life

S. Newton Pettis was born in Lenox, Ohio.  He studied law, was admitted to the bar in 1848 and commenced practice in Meadville, Pennsylvania.  He was a delegate to the 1860 Republican National Convention.

Public service

On March 21, 1861, President Lincoln appointed Pettis an associate justice of Colorado Territory, but he never really served in the position. He departed Denver some time after July 30, 1861 without ever presiding over the court he was appointed to. He remained absent until his replacement, Allen A. Bradford was appointed associate justice in June 1862. He returned to Meadville and continued to practice law.

Pettis was elected as a Republican to the Fortieth Congress to fill the vacancy caused by the death of Darwin A. Finney.  He was an unsuccessful candidate for reelection in 1868.  He resumed the practice of law in Meadville.

Pettis was appointed Minister to Bolivia September 4, 1878, and served until November 1, 1879.  He was again engaged in the practice of law until his death in Meadville in 1900.  Interment in Greendale Cemetery.

Sources

The Political Graveyard

References

Pennsylvania lawyers
Justices of the Colorado Supreme Court
1827 births
1900 deaths
Ambassadors of the United States to Bolivia
19th-century American diplomats
Republican Party members of the United States House of Representatives from Pennsylvania
19th-century American politicians
Colorado Territory officials
Burials at Greendale Cemetery
19th-century American judges
19th-century American lawyers